Bali-og, also spelled baliog, are traditional layered necklaces of various ethnic groups in the islands of Visayas and Mindanao in the  Philippines. They consist of chokers and necklaces with a fringe of beads and other ornaments. More than one is usually worn, layered over each other. Their elements usually consist of metal or glass beads, hollowed seeds, seashells, mother-of-pearl, and copper or brass ornaments.

Types

Lumad
Among the various Lumad peoples of Mindanao, particularly the inter-related Manobo groups, bali-og are bead necklaces composed chokers and necklaces fastened around the neck. A fringe of more beads and other ornaments (including copper or brass bells, amulets, and shells) are then attached to the lower edge of the chokers. The wearing of beadwork among the various Manobo tribes is culturally very important. The number, colors, and patterns vary by tribe and by status. The largest type of bali-og is a women's necklace known as ginibang. Its name means "monitor lizard" due to the resemblance of the patterns to monitor lizard scales.

Suludnon
Among the Visayan Suludnon people of Panay, bali-og are similar in construction to Mindanao bali-og but are instead made from strips of cloth with traditional embroidery known as panubok. They also have a fringe made of beads attached to coins.

Archaeology
In Surigao del Sur, a similar necklace was found in the "Surigao Hoard" in 1981. It consists of several layered collars with a fringe of successively smaller beads. It is made entirely of gold and has been dated to the 9th to 10th century AD. It has been named the tutubi ("dragonfly") collar, due to the resemblance of the fringes to dragonfly bodies. It is currently part of the collection of the museum of the Bangko Sentral ng Pilipinas.

See also
Agimat

References

Necklaces
Philippine clothing
Arts in the Philippines
Visayan culture
Types of jewellery